The 1994 United States Senate election in Pennsylvania was held November 8, 1994. Incumbent Democratic U.S. Senator Harris Wofford, who was appointed to the position in 1991 and won a special election the same year, sought re-election to a full six-year term, but he was defeated by Republican Rick Santorum. By a margin of 2.5%, this election was the second-closest race of the 1994 Senate election cycle, behind only the election in California.

Democratic primary

Candidates 
 Harris Wofford, incumbent U.S. Senator

Results

Republican primary

Candidates 
 Rick Santorum, U.S. Representative for PA-18
 Joseph P. Watkins, pastor of the Christ Evangelical Lutheran Church in Philadelphia

Results

General election

Candidates 
 Harris Wofford (D), incumbent U.S. Senator
 Rick Santorum (R), U.S. Representative for PA-18

Campaign 
Wofford's campaign was hurt from the outset by his strong connection with President Bill Clinton's failed healthcare reform proposals; Wofford had made working toward universal healthcare a crucial issue in his prior campaign and was one of the executive's strongest allies on the issue. After this failure, however, the senator ran a relatively passive campaign. He instead attempted to focus attention on his challenger, an arch-conservative who did not attempt to moderate his views after the primary election. The polarizing Santorum took strong positions against abortion, gay rights, and affirmative action, and he even clashed with some of the traditional fixtures of the state's moderate Republican establishment. Early in the campaign and with little statewide name recognition, Santorum made a critical error by attacking Social Security, and Wofford appeared to be in relatively safe position. However, Santorum ran an effective grassroots campaign and specifically targeted many union Democrats who had reservations about the liberal social values advocated by many of their party's leaders.

In the closing weeks of the campaign, Santorum was greatly helped by strong Republican enthusiasm because of anger over Clinton's failed initiatives. He solidified his status by running a series of positive ads that attempted to define his character strengths and to contrast with Wofford's negative commercials. Santorum eventually received a close victory by performing well (and nearly winning) his home in the suburban Pittsburgh region and through particularly low turnout in Democratic strongholds, such as Philadelphia, Scranton, and Pittsburgh.

Debates 
Complete video of debate, October 14, 1994
Complete video of debate, October 30, 1994

Results 

|-bgcolor="#EEEEEE"
| colspan="3" align=right | Totals
| align=right | 3,513,361
| align=right | 100.00%
| align=right | 

|}

See also 
 1994 United States Senate elections

References 

1994 Pennsylvania elections
Pennsylvania
1994
Rick Santorum